István Görgényi (born 2 November 1946) is a Hungarian former water polo player who won a silver medal at  the 1972 Summer Olympics and coached the Australian women's national water polo team to the gold medal at the 2000 Sydney Olympics.

Playing career
Gorgenyi represented Hungary as a player 96 times and was a member of teams that won the silver medal at 1972 Munich Olympics, won the  gold medal at the 1973 World Championships, the silver medal at the 1975 World Championships and won the gold medal at the 1974 European Water Polo Championship. He retired at 36 and took up coaching 18 months later.

Coaching career
From 1984 to 1990, he was Head Coach of Ujpest TE Sporting Club in the Hungarian National League from 1984 to 1990. Results during this period were: first in 1986, second in 1989 and third in 1987 and semi-finalist in 1986 European Cup of Champions. From 1991 to 1994, he was  Head  Coach of CACEL Nice Water Polo Club in the French National League in 1991. Results during this period were: first in 1992, 1993, 1994 and second in 1991.

Gorgenyi was appointed head coach of its Victorian Intensive Training Centre in 1994 and national development coach in 1996.
 He became national junior coach in 1997. On 1 June 1998, Gorgenyi, was appointed Australian women's national water polo team  Head Coach and the inaugural Australian Institute of Sport women's water polo program Head Coach. Gorgenyi coached the Australian team to win the inaugural women's water polo gold medal at the 2000 Sydney Olympics. Gorgenyi retired in December 2004 and was replaced by Greg McFadden as National Head Coach and AIS Head Coach in January 2005. In 2019, he was inducted into the Water Polo Australia Hall of Fame.

Major results of the Australian team during his period as Head Coach of the Australian team:

Olympic Games
 2000 — 1st place
 2004 — 4th place

FINA World Championship
 2001 — 5th place
 2003 — 7th place

FINA World Cup
 1999 — 2nd place
 2002 — 6th place

In 2005, Gorgenyi set up a consultancy to promote his 'Hunting Territory ' philosophy - "a form of behaviour by which a player or more commonly a small group of players form ownerships of parts of the team process, often subconsciously, and, disdaining the broad collective interest, ultimately cause it to break down."

See also
 Hungary men's Olympic water polo team records and statistics
 Australia women's Olympic water polo team records and statistics
 List of Olympic champions in women's water polo
 List of Olympic medalists in water polo (men)
 List of world champions in men's water polo
 List of World Aquatics Championships medalists in water polo

References

External links
 

1946 births
Living people
Hungarian male water polo players
Olympic water polo players of Hungary
Water polo players at the 1972 Summer Olympics
Medalists at the 1972 Summer Olympics
Olympic silver medalists for Hungary
Olympic medalists in water polo
Hungarian water polo coaches
Australian water polo coaches
Australian Institute of Sport coaches
Australian Olympic coaches
Australia women's national water polo team coaches
Water polo coaches at the 2000 Summer Olympics
Water polo coaches at the 2004 Summer Olympics